Torre Alta is a tower located in San Fernando in the Province of Cádiz, Andalusia, Spain.

References

Buildings and structures in San Fernando, Cádiz
Towers in Spain
Bien de Interés Cultural landmarks in the Province of Cádiz